Ruslan Vladimirovich Lunev (born 25 July 1989) is an Azerbaijani sports shooter. He is the son of Azerbaijani Olympic bronze medalist Irada Ashumova and her husband and coach Vladimir Lunev. He competed in the men's 10 metre air pistol event at the 2016 Summer Olympics.

He qualified to represent Azerbaijan at the 2020 Summer Olympics in the men's 25 metre rapid fire pistol event.

References

External links
 

1989 births
Living people
Azerbaijani male sport shooters
Olympic shooters of Azerbaijan
Shooters at the 2016 Summer Olympics
Shooters at the 2020 Summer Olympics
Azerbaijani people of Russian descent
Sportspeople from Baku
European Games competitors for Azerbaijan
Shooters at the 2015 European Games
Shooters at the 2019 European Games
Islamic Solidarity Games competitors for Azerbaijan
21st-century Azerbaijani people